David Attewell (born 21 January 1974) is an English retired professional basketball player and national team player who lastly played for the Derby Trailblazers of the English Basketball League.

References

External links
Eurobasket.com Profile
Sports-Reference.com Profile
BritBall.com Profile

1974 births
Living people
Basketball players from Greater London
Centers (basketball)
English men's basketball players
Power forwards (basketball)
Siena Saints men's basketball players